Karma Yonzon is an Indian composer of Nepali music based in Darjeeling. He is the brother of musician Gopal Yonzon.

He has composed music for numerous singers like Narayan Gopal, Aruna Lama, Dilmaya Khati, Kumar Subba, Daisy Baraily and Pema Lama. He scored the music for the well-known Nepali play Ani Deurali Runcha, written by Man Bahadur Mukhia with songs like Sarangi Ko Taar Le Mero, Hey Phool Chudera Laney Ho and Deurali Ko Thiti Ho.

References

Indian musicians
People from Darjeeling
Living people
Indian Gorkhas
Year of birth missing (living people)
Tamang people
Musicians from West Bengal